Sacred Lie is a 1955 West German drama film directed by Wolfgang Liebeneiner and starring Ulla Jacobsson, Karlheinz Böhm and Erwin Strahl.

It was shot at the Tempelhof Studios in Berlin. The film's sets were designed by the art directors Ernst Richter and Hans Ledersteger.

Synopsis
A young woman from the country comes to work as a maid in a wealthy household. She develops a relationship with the unreliable son of the family who gets her pregnant. He reforms and they marry.

Cast
 Ulla Jacobsson as Lena Larsen
 Karlheinz Böhm as Peter Weiland
 Erwin Strahl as Bo Larsen
 Hans Nielsen as Otto Weiland
 Lucie Englisch as Köchin Rosa
 Hans Quest as Paul Weiland
 Alice Treff as Ilse Weiland
 Wolfgang Neuss as Hermann
 Franca Parisi as Anita
 Liselotte Malkowsky as Singer
 Maria Sebaldt
 Fritz Tillmann
 Erich Arnold

References

Bibliography
 Bock, Hans-Michael & Bergfelder, Tim. The Concise CineGraph. Encyclopedia of German Cinema. Berghahn Books, 2009.

External links 
 

1955 films
1955 drama films
German drama films
West German films
1950s German-language films
Films directed by Wolfgang Liebeneiner
Constantin Film films
Films shot at Tempelhof Studios
German black-and-white films
1950s German films